During the 2005–06 English football season, Brentford competed in Football League One. For the second season in succession, the club reached the FA Cup fifth round and the play-off semi-finals.

Season summary

After defeat to Sheffield Wednesday in the 2005 League One play-off semi-finals, Brentford manager Martin Allen strengthened the squad with a number of acquisitions on free transfers, including a raid on Reading (Ricky Newman, Paul Brooker and former Bees favourite Lloyd Owusu), youngsters Ólafur Ingi Skúlason and Sam Tillen and non-league forward DJ Campbell. Still heavily in debt to former chairman Ron Noades' company Altonwood, the club had ongoing budgetary concerns, with the departure of London Broncos as tenants of Griffin Park losing the club £100,000. By mid-August 2005, Supporters' Trust Bees United (which had taken operational control of the club in 2003) had raised £700,000 of the £1,000,000 needed to acquire a majority shareholding. Former Director-General of the BBC Greg Dyke, a lifelong supporter, loaned the club money in the autumn.

Brentford began the season as one of the top teams in League One, with five wins from the opening eight league matches putting the club at the top of the table. A 3–2 defeat to Huddersfield Town on 17 September led to a dip in form and a run of two wins in 9 matches in all competitions dropped the Bees dropped to 4th place. After first round exits of the League Cup and Football League Trophy, victory in the FA Cup first round over Rochdale on 5 November began a resurgence in form, with Brentford losing just twice in 20 matches and returning to the top of the table for the first time in over three months after victory over previous leaders Swansea City at Griffin Park on Boxing Day.

Brentford advanced to the fifth round of the FA Cup for the second consecutive season, defeating Oldham Athletic and Stockport County in the second and third rounds before completing a giant-killing of Premier League strugglers Sunderland in the fourth round at Griffin Park. Brentford's form owed much to the goalscoring of Lloyd Owusu and DJ Campbell, with Campbell scoring eight goals in six matches in January 2006, which included both the Bees' goals in the victory over Sunderland. Campbell's performance versus the Black Cats won national attention and three days later, on transfer deadline day, he was sold to Premier League club Birmingham City for a £500,000 fee. Despite the sale of then-top scorer Campbell, January 2006 was a good month for the Bees, with Bees United acquiring the majority shareholding of the club and the appointment of Greg Dyke as non-executive chairman.

Three consecutive wins at the beginning of February 2006 put the club in 3rd position in advance of the visit to Charlton Athletic for the FA Cup fifth round match. A 3–1 defeat ended a memorable cup run and the Bees' form began to suffer, with four defeats in the next seven league matches, but two consecutive wins in early March elevated the club into 2nd place. DJ Campbell's replacement Calum Willock failed to materialise as a goal threat, a lean spell from Lloyd Owusu and injury to set-piece taker Kevin O'Connor led to the team's goals drying up. Beginning with a win over Milton Keynes Dons on 28 March, Brentford went unbeaten for the rest of the season, but six draws from the final seven matches dropped the club out of the automatic promotion places. The Bees' goalscoring problems were further compounded after Lloyd Owusu suffered a torn groin muscle while on international duty with Ghana on 26 April, which ruled him out for the rest of the season and put him out of contention for a place in Ghana's 2006 World Cup squad.

3rd-place Brentford met 6th-place Swansea City in the League One play-off semi-finals, but despite taking the lead at the Liberty Stadium and largely controlling the first leg, Swans defender Sam Ricketts salvaged a 1–1 draw with a deflected shot in the dying minutes. Two quick-fire goals from Swansea City forward Leon Knight in the first 15 minutes of the second leg at Griffin Park killed the tie and Brentford exited the play-offs 3–1 on aggregate.

League table

Results
Brentford's goal tally listed first.

Legend

Pre-season

Football League One

Football League play-offs

FA Cup

Football League Cup

Football League Trophy

 Sources: Soccerbase, 11v11

Playing squad 
Players' ages are as of the opening day of the 2005–06 season.

 Source: Soccerbase

Coaching staff

Statistics

Appearances and goals
Substitute appearances in brackets.

 Players listed in italics left the club mid-season.
 Source: Soccerbase

Goalscorers 

 Players listed in italics left the club mid-season.
 Source: Soccerbase

Discipline

 Players listed in italics left the club mid-season.
 Source: ESPN FC

International caps

Management

Summary

Transfers & loans

Kit

|
|

Awards 

 Supporters' Player of the Year: Michael Turner
 Players' Player of the Year: Michael Turner & Jay Tabb (joint winners)
 Most Improved Player of the Year: Andy Frampton
 Football League One PFA Team of the Year: Sam Sodje
 Football League One Player of the Month: DJ Campbell (January 2006)
 Football League One Manager of the Month: Martin Allen (February 2006)
 Football League Community Club of the Year
 BBC London Sports Personality of 2005: Martin Allen

References

Brentford F.C. seasons
Brentford